The 1972–73 Winnipeg Jets season was their first season in the World Hockey Association (WHA). The Jets' first player signed was Norm Beaudin ("the Original Jet") and their first major signing was Bobby Hull.

Offseason

Bobby Hull
Long unhappy because of his relatively poor salary in the period when he was hockey's preeminent superstar, Hull responded to overtures from the upstart World Hockey Association's Winnipeg Jets in 1972 by jesting that he'd jump to them for a million dollars, a sum then considered absurd. Gathering the other league owners together to contribute to the unprecedented amount on the grounds that inking such a major star would give instant credibility to the new rival league that was competing directly against the entrenched NHL, Jets' owner Ben Hatskin agreed to the sum and signed Hull for a contract worth $1,000,000 over ten years. Although his debut with Winnipeg was held up in litigation by the NHL, Hull instantly became the WHA's greatest star.

Regular season

When the Jets played their first game on October 12 in New York against the Raiders, the Jets were without Bobby Hull. He was in court battling his former team, the Chicago Black Hawks over his new contract. The Jets would still win that first game 6–4. Three days later, the Jets would make their home debut losing to the Alberta Oilers 5–2. Bobby Hull won his court battle and joined the Jets 15 games into the season. Bobby Hull captured the WHA's first MVP award, by scoring 51 goals. The Jets won the Western Division with a 43–31–4 record.

Season standings

Playoffs
In the playoffs, the Jets would beat the Minnesota Fighting Saints in 5 games. In the second round of the playoffs, the Jets beat the Houston Aeros in 4 straight to reach the Avco World Trophy finals. In the finals, the Jets were beaten by the New England Whalers in 5 games.

Winnipeg Jets 4, Minnesota Fighting Saints 1

Winnipeg Jets 4, Houston Aeros 0

New England Whalers 4, Winnipeg Jets 1 – Avco Cup Finals

Awards and records
 Bobby Hull, Gary L. Davidson Award

Player statistics

Forwards

Note: GP= Games played; G= Goals; A= Assists; PTS = Points; PIM = Points

Defencemen

Note: GP= Games played; G= Goals; A= Assists; PTS = Points; PIM = Points

Goaltending

Note: GP= Games played; MIN= Minutes; W= Wins; L= Losses; T = Ties; SO = Shutouts; GAA = Goals against

References
Jets on Hockey Database
Jets on Sports Encyclopedia

Winnipeg Jets (1972–1996) seasons
Winn
Winn
Winnipeg Jets
Winnipeg Jets